Feelin' Good is an album by jazz group The Three Sounds featuring performances recorded in 1960 and released on the Blue Note label. It was released on CD only in Japan.

Reception

The Allmusic review by Stephen Thomas Erlewine awarded the album 4 stars stating "An appropriate title for an utterly charming set from the Three Sounds. The trio works familiar territory on Feelin' Good, playing a set of swinging hard bop and classy soul-jazz, but there's a definite spark in the air... It captures the Three Sounds at a peak, which means Feelin' Good is an excellent example of early soul-jazz".

Track listing
 "When I Fall in Love" (Heyman, Young) - 4:56
 "Parker's Pad" (Gene Harris) - 3:37
 "Blues After Dark" (Golson) - 3:45
 "I Got It Bad (and That Ain't Good)" (Ellington) - 6:21
 "Straight, No Chaser" (Monk) - 6:41
 "I Let a Song Go Out of My Heart" (Duke Ellington, Irving Mills) - 4:08
 "It Could Happen to You" (Burke, Van Heusen) - 5:31
 "Two Bass Hit" (Lewis, Gillespie) - 3:52

Personnel
Gene Harris - piano
Andrew Simpkins - bass
Bill Dowdy - drums

References

Blue Note Records albums
The Three Sounds albums
1961 albums
Albums produced by Alfred Lion
Albums recorded at Van Gelder Studio